= Keyva King =

American businesswoman

Kevya King is the founder of Earth Essentials and is the CEO of the Royal Highness Cannabis Boutique in Palm Desert, California.

== See also ==
- Cannabis
- Medical cannabis
